A Claddagh ring is a traditional Irish ring in which a heart represents love, the crown stands for loyalty, and two clasped hands symbolize friendship.

The design and customs associated with it originated in Claddagh, County Galway. Its modern form was first produced in the 17th century.

Description
The Claddagh ring belongs to a group of European finger rings called fede rings. The name derives from the Italian phrase  ("hands [joined] in faith" or "hands [joined] in loyalty"). This group dates to Ancient Rome, where the gesture of clasping hands meant pledging vows. Cut or cast in bezels, they were used as engagement and wedding rings in medieval and Renaissance Europe to signify "plighted troth". 

In recent years it has been embellished with interlace designs and combined with other Celtic and Irish symbols, corresponding with its popularity as an emblem of Irish identity.

Origins
Galway has produced Claddagh rings continuously since at least 1700, but the name "Claddagh ring" was not used before the 1830s. Although there are various myths and legends around the origin of the Claddagh ring, it is almost certain that it originated in or close to the small fishing village of Claddagh in Galway.

As an example of a maker, Bartholomew Fallon was a 17th-century Irish goldsmith, based in Galway, who made Claddagh rings until circa 1700. His name first appears in the will of one Dominick Martin, also a jeweller, dated 26 January 1676, in which Martin willed Fallon some of his tools. Fallon continued working as a goldsmith until 1700. His are among the oldest surviving examples of the Claddagh ring, in many cases bearing his signature.

There are many legends about the origins of the ring, particularly concerning Richard Joyce, a silversmith from Galway circa 1700, who is said to have invented the Claddagh design as we know it. Legend has it that Joyce was captured and enslaved by Algerian Corsairs around 1675 while on a passage to the West Indies; he was sold into slavery to a Moorish goldsmith who taught him the craft. King William III sent an ambassador to Algeria to demand the release of any and all British subjects who were enslaved in that country, which at the time would have included Richard Joyce. After fourteen years, Joyce was released and returned to Galway and brought along with him the ring he had fashioned while in captivity: what we've come to know as the Claddagh.  He gave the ring to his sweetheart, married, and became a goldsmith with "considerable success". His initials are in one of the earliest surviving Claddagh rings, but there are three other rings also made around that time, bearing the mark of goldsmith Thomas Meade.

The Victorian antiquarian Sir William Jones described the Claddagh, and gives Chambers' Book of Days as the source, in his book Finger-Ring Lore. Jones says: 

An account written in 1906 by William Dillon, a Galway jeweller, claimed that the "Claddagh" ring was worn in the Aran Isles, Connemara and beyond. Knowledge of the ring and its customs spread within Ireland and Britain during the Victorian period, and this is when its name became established. Galway jewellers began to market it beyond the local area in the 19th century. Further recognition came in the 20th century. 

In his 1911 book Rings for the Finger, American mineralogist George Frederick Kunz addresses the importance of gold wedding rings in Ireland and includes a captioned photograph of a Claddagh ring.

Usage and symbolism
The Claddagh's distinctive design features two hands clasping a heart and usually surmounted by a crown. These elements symbolize the qualities of love (the heart), friendship (the hands), and loyalty (the crown). A "Fenian" Claddagh ring, without a crown, is a slightly different take on the design but has not achieved the level of popularity of the crowned version. Claddagh rings are relatively popular among the Irish and those of Irish heritage, such as Irish Americans, as cultural symbols and as friendship, engagement and wedding rings.

While Claddagh rings are sometimes used as friendship rings, they are most commonly used as engagement and wedding rings. Mothers sometimes give these rings to their daughters when they come of age. There are several mottos and wishes associated with the ring, such as: "Let love and friendship reign." In Ireland, the United States, Canada, and other parts of the Irish diaspora, the Claddagh is sometimes handed down mother-to-eldest daughter or grandmother-to-granddaughter.

According to Irish author Colin Murphy, a Claddagh ring is traditionally worn with the intention of conveying the wearer's relationship status:
On the right hand with the point of the heart toward the fingertips: the wearer is single and might be looking for love.
On the right hand with the point of the heart toward the wrist: the wearer is in a relationship; someone "has captured their heart"
On the left ring finger with the point of the heart toward the fingertips: the wearer is engaged.
On the left ring finger with the point of the heart toward the wrist: the wearer is married.

There are other localized variations and oral traditions, in both Ireland and the Irish diaspora, involving the hand and the finger on which the Claddagh is worn. Folklore about the ring is relatively recent, not ancient, with the lore about them almost wholly based in oral tradition; there is "very little native Irish writing about the ring", hence, the difficulty today in finding any scholarly or non-commercial source that explains the traditional ways of wearing the ring.

See also

References

External links

 18th century Claddagh ring – Victoria and Albert museum

17th-century introductions
Culture in Galway (city)
Engagement
Irish culture
Rings (jewellery)
Wedding objects